Czesław Hoc (born 22 February 1954) is a Polish politician. He was elected to the Sejm on 25 September 2005, getting 10,746 votes in the 40-Koszalin district, as a candidate of the Law and Justice. Prior to his entry into politics, Hoc was a doctor at the Kołobrzeg Medical Center, receiving his doctorate of medicine from the Pomeranian Medical University in 1979.

During a local referendum, MP Hoc supported the antinuclear movement in Mielno and Gąski where 94% of inhabitants voted against Polish government's NPP location.

He became a Member of the European Parliament (MEP) in November 2015, replacing Marek Gróbarczyk.

See also
Members of Polish Sejm 2005–07

References

External links
Sejm page

1954 births
Living people
People from Chojna
Law and Justice MEPs
MEPs for Poland 2014–2019
Members of the Polish Sejm 2005–2007
Members of the Polish Sejm 2007–2011
Members of the Polish Sejm 2011–2015
Members of the Polish Sejm 2015–2019
Members of the Polish Sejm 2019–2023